Hypoderma is a genus of fungi within the Rhytismataceae family. According to a 2008 estimate, the genus contains 54 species.

Species

H. aceris
H. alborubrum
H. alpinum
H. berberidis
H. bidwillii
H. bihospitum
H. borneense
H. campanulatum
H. caricis
H. carinatum
H. commune
H. cookianum
H. cordylines
H. corni
H. cuspidatum
H. dryadis
H. dundasicum
H. eucalypti
H. ferulae
H. gaultheriae
H. handelii
H. hansbroughii
H. hederae
H. ilicinum
H. junipericola
H. labiorum-aurantiorum
H. liliense
H. linderae
H. mirabile
H. obtectum
H. qinlingense
H. rhododendri-mariesii
H. rubi
H. rufilabrum
H. shiqii
H. sigmoideum
H. smilacicola
H. stephanandrae
H. sticheri
H. tillandsiae
H. tunicatum
H. urniforme

References

Leotiomycetes
Taxa named by Giuseppe De Notaris
Taxa described in 1847